Shaun Benson (born January 16, 1976) is a Canadian actor and director.

Early life
Benson was born in Guelph, Ontario. He is the son of Eugene Benson, an English professor and a prolific novelist, playwright and librettist. He later graduated from the University of Western Ontario with a bachelor of science in chemistry and biochemistry, before studying acting at the George Brown College Theater School in Toronto.

While at university he began training Karate. He currently holds a 5th Degree Black Belt and his Renshi Teaching Certificate in Legacy Shorin Ryu under Hanshi Gary Legacy and Kyoshi Randy Dauphin and a Purple Belt in Brazillian Jiu Jitsu from Toronto BJJ under Jorge Britto with his time in Los Angeles spent training with Jean-Jacques Machado

Career

As an actor
His early roles as an actor included theatrical productions of John Palmer's Singapore, Fabrizio Filippo's Waiting for Lewis, William Shakespeare's Love's Labour's Lost and Robin Fulford's Steel Kiss.

In 2000, he appeared in a Molson Canadian commercial as a Canadian office worker who unleashes a torrent of hockey-style violence on an American coworker taunting him with Canadian stereotypes. In 2001, he was cast in a lead role in the television drama series The Associates.

In 2002, following the cancellation of The Associates he was cast in the legal drama series Just Cause, which ran for one season.

Benson played the recurring role of Dr. Steven Lars Webber on the soap opera General Hospital from 2004 to 2005, which attracted him considerable attention compared to his previous roles. Since his time on General Hospital, Benson has guest starred in numerous television series, including Cold Case, The Unit, and Being Erica. In 2008, he appeared in the Proud Family film Oscar Proud.

In 2012, Benson starred in the IMAX 3D documentary film Flight of the Butterflies and in French comedy Populaire.

In the 2015 made-for-TV movie Kept Woman, Shaun played an eccentric professor, Simon, who kidnaps his neighbor Jessica, played by Courtney Ford. Also in 2015, he starred in the Starz television series The Girlfriend Experience.

In 2016, Benson appeared in the Netflix time loop thriller ARQ as Sonny, as well as Season 2 of the series Gangland Undercover as Crowbar. He subsequently appeared in the SyFy series Channel Zero as the town sheriff, Gary Yolen.

Between 2017 and 2021 Benson appeared in many prestige projects including The Boys on Amazon as Ezekiel, Tiny Pretty Things on Netflix as Brooks, Code 8 as Dixon as well as independent and TV film work for Lifetime, SyFy, etc

As a director 
In 2013, he directed Stop/Kiss by Diana Son for the Toronto Fringe Festival.  The play won best of festival and garnered and extended run.

In 2014, Benson directed the independent film Barn Wedding,  which won the HMV People's Pick For Best Flick award at the 2015 Canadian Film Fest.

In 2021, Shaun co-wrote, co-directed and starred, with Karen Knox, in Borderline which had its World Premiere in the UK at Crystal Palace International Film Festival and its North American Premiere at Dances With Films at the Chinese Theatre.

Filmography

Film

Television

References

External links

1976 births
Living people
Canadian male soap opera actors
Canadian male television actors
Canadian people of Northern Ireland descent
People from Guelph
Male actors from Ontario
University of Western Ontario alumni
George Brown College alumni
Canadian male film actors
Canadian male stage actors
Film directors from Ontario
Canadian theatre directors
20th-century Canadian male actors
21st-century Canadian male actors